Crucihammus is a genus of longhorn beetles of the subfamily Lamiinae.

Species List 

 Crucihammus grossepunctatus (Breuning, 1964)
 Crucihammus laosicus (Breuning, 1965)
 Crucihammus subcruciatus Breuning, 1936
 Crucihammus sumatranus Breuning, 1954

References

Lamiini